The Iowa Hawkeyes field hockey team is the intercollegiate field hockey program representing the University of Iowa. The school competes in the Big Ten Conference in Division I of the National Collegiate Athletic Association (NCAA). The Iowa field hockey team plays its home games at Dr. Christine H.B. Grant Field on the university campus in Iowa City, Iowa. The Hawkeyes have won 16 conference championships (13 in the Big Ten), six Big Ten tournament titles, and the 1986 NCAA Championship, making it the first Midwestern university to win a national title. As of 2014, the team is coached by Lisa Cellucci.

History 
Field hockey has been a varsity sport at the University of Iowa since 1973, before that field hockey was a club sport. Iowa was a leader in early implementation of the Title IX legislation, which was passed in 1972. Christine Grant, PhD, was coach in 1973 and 1974 before she retired from coaching to become Iowa women's athletics director and a national voice for women in sport. She was also president of the Association for Intercollegiate Athletics for Women (AIAW) - which was the governing organization for women's intercollegiate athletics before the NCAA took over. From 1981 to 1989 and again since 1992, the Hawkeyes have been members of the Big Ten Conference, while they participated in the Midwestern Collegiate Field Hockey Conference (MCFHC) during the 1990 and 1991 seasons. Iowa is one of the most accomplished field hockey programs in the Big Ten, with 16 claimed conference championships (13 in the Big Ten), six conference tournament titles, and 11 NCAA Final Four appearances to its credit. In 1986, the Hawkeyes became the first field hockey team from the Midwest to win the national championship, when they beat New Hampshire 2–1 in double overtime in the NCAA title game. Additionally, Iowa has cumulatively amassed a total of 85 national All-Americans, 152 regional All-Americans, and 162 All-Conference selections. In program history, the Hawkeyes have had a total of only five head coaches: Margie Greenberg (1977), Judith Davidson (1978–87), Beth Beglin (1988–99), Tracey Griesbaum (2000–13), and Lisa Cellucci (2014–present). In addition to Cellucci, who is herself a former Iowa player, Hawkeye alumni have attained the position of head coach at numerous other NCAA programs, including Ball State (Annette Payne), Dartmouth (Amy Fowler), Indiana (Amy Robertson), Kent State (Kerry [Horgan] Devries), Michigan (Marcia Pankratz), Princeton (Kristen Holmes-Winn), Rutgers (Liz Tchou), Stanford (Lesley Irvine), and Virginia (Michele Madison and Missi Sanders).

Season-by-season results

In 1973, five Hawkeyes were selected to play on the all-Iowa college team: Sue Lewis, Caroline Emrich, Sue Bouch, Liz Ullman, and Robyn Linn. The 1974 season, coached by Christine Grant, had a 1-6-4 record. Two Hawkeyes were selected to play on the State Field Hockey team:  Liz Ullman and Sue Bouck. The 1975 team, coached by Margie Greenberg, had a 3-6-2 record. The 1976 team's record was 9-5-2. Three Hawkeyes advanced to the State Team that year: Carla Seltzer, Barb Resnick and Karen Zamora. Karen Zamora was then selected as a qualifier for the National Field Hockey Tournament.

Season-by-season results through the end of the 2014 season

Awards and accolades

National championships
Iowa has been well represented at the NCAA Championships, appearing 22 times with 11 Final Four appearances. In 1986, the Hawkeyes beat conference rivals Northwestern en route to the Final Four. There, they shut out Penn State 2–0 and topped New Hampshire 2–1 for their first national championship, becoming the first women's team at the university to win an NCAA Championship.

Conference championships
Iowa has won 16 conference titles, 13 in the Big Ten Conference and three in the Midwest Collegiate Field Hockey Conference (MCFHC).

All-Americans

Olympians

Awards and accolades through the end of the 2014 season

Stadium 

Iowa has played its home games at Dr. Christine H.B. Grant Field since its construction in 1989. Originally named Hawkeye Field Hockey Field, in 1991 the stadium was renamed in honor of Christine Grant, the founder of the Iowa field hockey program and former Women's Athletics director of the university. Grant Field was rededicated in 2006 after the completion of significant renovations that included a new playing surface, a permanent grandstand, new concession facilities, restrooms, and a press box. Described by former Michigan field hockey player and current Big Ten Network analyst Kara Lentz as "the best facility in the Big Ten", Grant Field has witnessed a 40-game Iowa home winning streak in addition to undefeated Hawkeyes home campaigns on six separate occasions. The stadium's official capacity is 1,000, while its all-time single-game attendance record stands at 1,339, which was set during a game against Penn State on October 24, 1993.

Title IX Activism 
In the wake of the firing of former University of Iowa Field Hockey Coach Tracey Griesbaum on August 4, 2014, current players Chandler Ackers and Natalie Cafone joined former players Jessy Silfer and Dani Hemeon in filing a Title IX complaint with the U.S. Department of Education. Coach Griesbaum was terminated after former players levied a series of allegations against her coaching methods and the culture within the field hockey program. Despite an internal investigation by the university determining that she had not violated any university policy, Griesbaum was fired just days before the start of the 2014 season.

At the heart of the complaint filed with the Office of Civil Rights (OCR), the agency responsible for overseeing Title IX compliance within the Department of Education, are allegations that the University of Iowa's Athletic Department engages in discriminatory practices and decision-making, often resulting in the removal of highly qualified female coaches from female programs. The student-athletes further allege that the removal of top female coaches deny to female athletes educational benefits protected under Title IX.

As provided by Title IX of the Education Amendments of 1972, “[n]o person in the United States shall, on the basis of sex, be excluded from participation in, be denied the benefits of, or be subjected to discrimination under any education program or activity receiving Federal financial assistance.” As a state institution of higher education, the University of Iowa is subject to the provisions of Title IX.

While Title IX compliance issues are commonplace in collegiate athletics, and generally center on such things as equal opportunity to participate, and access to equal facilities, the complaint submitted by the University of Iowa Field Hockey players is unique in its interpretation of gender discrimination. The players contend that Coach Griesbaum was terminated for engaging in the same coaching methods and practices utilized by male coaches. The student-athletes go on to claim that by holding female coaches and student-athletes to different standards than their male counterparts – standards largely shaped by sex stereotypes – the school undermines the success of women's programs, and denies female student-athletes the opportunity to learn from top coaches, and compete at the highest level.

Many of the practices and standards challenged in the complaint are rooted in a paternalistic view of women's athletics. The Title IX complaint cites numerous examples of double standards that exist within the University of Iowa's Athletic Department. For instance, the student-athletes note that the university places a higher level of expectation on female coaches of women's programs to manage players’ minor injuries and emotional sensitivities. The complaint alleges a pattern of negative consequences for women coaches for failure to adequately respond to complaints from parents and players.

Conversely, the university is more likely to give male coaches the benefit of the doubt when faced with accusations of wrongdoing. For example, thirteen football players were hospitalized with rhabodomyolysis, a stress-induced degenerative muscle syndrome, after an arduous off-season workout in 2011.  Despite the very serious physical injuries facing these football players, the University of Iowa stood by the coach involved in the incident, and he was later named “Assistant Coach of the Year.”

Some feminist commentators suggest that the current model of sport is designed for men's interests, and that women's athletic pursuits are less competitive, and more recreational. Advocates of this position would acknowledge real differences between men and women, and construct an athletic system that creates substantive equality between the sexes. Under this view of gender equity, one might be able to argue that different coaching methods are necessary to provide both male and female athletes with similarly positive collegiate athletic experiences.

However, this Title IX complaint filed with the OCR is based on a formal equality approach to gender equity. The University of Iowa Field Hockey student-athletes’ allegations are remarkable because it challenges assumptions that would hold female and male student-athletes and coaches to varying levels of competitiveness and standards of behavior. As Ackers and Cafone have made clear, one major draw for many athletes to the University of Iowa Field Hockey program was the opportunity to play under Coach Griesbaum, and be pushed every day to reach their personal and athletic potential. The student-athletes agree, “we want to be made better every single day” and “we don’t want to be coddled like little girls.” The complaint's premise confronts stereotypes that greatly shape expectations for male and female student-athletes and coaches in college sports.

For their efforts on behalf of gender equality, Ackers, Cafone, Silfer, and Hemeon received the Jean Y. Jew Women's Rights Award. The complaint has sparked a national conversation on double standards that exist for female coaches and student-athletes in collegiate athletics. Although not directly tied to the complaint filed by Ackers, Cafone, Silfer, and Hemeon, the OCR began an audit of the University of Iowa Athletic Department in response allegations of unfair treatment of female student-athletes on April 11, 2016.

See also
List of NCAA Division I field hockey programs

References

External links